The longnut (Pleurobema nucleopsis) was a species of freshwater mussel, an aquatic bivalve mollusk in the family Unionidae, the river mussels.

This species was endemic to the United States. Its natural habitat was rivers.

References

Bivalves described in 1849
Extinct bivalves
Extinct animals of North America
Pleurobema
Taxonomy articles created by Polbot